Cao Thắng (1864 - 1893) was a Vietnamese anticolonial fighter. He was an assistant of Phan Đình Phùng, and was Phan's military coordinator. His forces operated in Thanh Hóa, Nghệ An and Hà Tĩnh provinces. He was killed in battle in 1893.

Cao Thắng is generally credited with organizing the local blacksmiths to manufacture thousands of Gras 1874 rifles to equip his troops.

References

1864 births
1893 deaths
Vietnamese nationalists
Vietnamese revolutionaries